Filippo Colombo (born 20 December 1997) is a Swiss cross-country mountain biker and road cyclist, who currently rides for UCI ProTeam .

He competed at the 2018 UCI Mountain Bike World Championships, winning a gold medal in the team relay.

Major results

Mountain Bike

2014
 1st  Cross-country, National Junior Championships
 2nd  Team relay, UCI World Championships
2016
 3rd  Team relay, UCI World Championships
2017
 1st  Team relay, UCI World Championships
 1st  Team relay, UEC European Championships
 1st  Cross-country, National Under-23 Championships
2018
 1st  Team relay, UCI World Championships
 1st  Cross-country, National Under-23 Championships
 UEC European Championships
2nd  Team relay
2nd  Under-23 Cross-country
 3rd Overall UCI Under-23 XCO World Cup
2019
 1st  Cross-country, National Under-23 Championships
 2nd  Cross-country, UCI World Under-23 Championships
 2nd  Cross-country, UEC European Under-23 Championships
 2nd Overall UCI Under-23 XCO World Cup
1st Albstadt
1st Lenzerheide
1st Snowshoe
2nd Nové Město
2nd Val di Sole
3rd Vallnord
2021
 3rd  Cross-country, UEC European Championships
 UCI XCC World Cup
3rd Snowshoe
2022
 1st  Short track, National Championships
 2nd  Short track, UCI World Championships
 2nd Overall UCI XCC World Cup
1st Lenzerheide
1st Mont-Sainte-Anne
3rd Nové Město
 UCI XCO World Cup
2nd Mont-Sainte-Anne
 Copa Catalana Internacional
2nd Banyoles
 3rd  Cross-country, UEC European Championships

Road
2021
 2nd Grand Prix Alanya

References

External links

1997 births
Living people
Swiss male cyclists
Swiss mountain bikers
Cyclists at the 2020 Summer Olympics
Olympic cyclists of Switzerland
20th-century Swiss people
21st-century Swiss people